The double kidney (Ipimorpha retusa) is a moth of the family Noctuidae. It is found in most of Europe. In the east, the range extends through Turkey, Siberia, Mongolia and China to Korea and Japan. The habitat consists of damp marshy places.

Technical description and variation

I. retusa L. (= vetula Hbn.) (46 h). Forewing olive brown dusted with whitish; inner and outer lines fine, nearly straight, parallel to each other, slightly oblique inwards, and paler edged; subterminal irregular, pale, with a darker shade beyond it; stigmata darker, edged with paler; the reniform on a darker median shade; hindwing fuscous, fringe whitish; — the form gracilis Haw. (= curvata Btlr.) is a redder form. Larva pale green; dorsal line broadly, the two subdorsal slenderly, white; the spiracular line white, waved; head green or dark brown.

The wingspan is 28–32 mm.

Biology
Adults are on wing from July to September.

The larvae feed on Salix and Populus species, spinning together the shoots and living between united leaves where it also pupates in a slight shelter. They can be found from May to June. The species overwinters as an egg.

References

External links 

Double Kidney on UKmoths
 Funet
 Lepiforum.de
 schmetterlinge-deutschlands.de

Moths described in 1761
Caradrinini
Moths of Japan
Moths of Europe
Moths of Asia
Taxa named by Carl Linnaeus